Alfred Walter Kinally (1908-1986) was a male athlete who competed for England.

Athletics career
He competed in the pole vault at the 1934 British Empire Games in London.

References

1908 births
1986 deaths
English male pole vaulters
Athletes (track and field) at the 1934 British Empire Games
Commonwealth Games competitors for England